Baode is a county in the northwest of Shanxi province, China, bordering Shaanxi province to the west. It is under the administration of Xinzhou city, and is its westernmost county-level division.

Baode is known for Jujube oil.

Administrative divisions 
Baode administers 4 towns and 9 townships:

Towns

 Dongguan (东关镇)
 Yimen (义门镇)
 Qiaotou (桥头镇)
 Yangjiawan (杨家湾镇)

Townships

Climate

References

www.xzqh.org 

County-level divisions of Shanxi
Xinzhou